Sebastian Sell (Greek: Σεβαστιανός Σελλ) is a Greece international rugby league footballer who plays for the Mittagong Lions.

Playing career
In 2022, Sell was named in the Greece squad for the 2021 Rugby League World Cup, the first ever Greek Rugby League squad to compete in a World Cup.

References

External links
Greek profile

Living people
Australian rugby league players
Australian people of Greek descent
Greece national rugby league team players
Year of birth missing (living people)